Paraperiglischrus is a genus of mites in the family Spinturnicidae. There are at least four described species in Paraperiglischrus, found in Asia, Europe, Africa, Australia, and the Pacific Islands.

The species of Paraperiglischrus, like the other members of this family, are parasites of bats. They live primarily on the wing and tail membranes of bats throughout all stages of life.

Species
These four species belong to the genus Paraperiglischrus:
 Paraperiglischrus hipposideros Baker & Delfinado, 1964
 Paraperiglischrus rhinolophinus (C. L. Koch, 1841)
 Paraperiglischrus ruber Estrada-Peña, Ballesta & Ibañez, 1992
 Paraperiglischrus sternalis Petrova & Taskaeva, 1975

References

Arachnids